María Dolores Alibés i Riera (2 January 1941 Vidrà, Osona - 8 November 2009 Sant Pau, Ripollès) was a Catalan author of children's books. She was the sister of sports journalist Arcadi Alibés, and was emotionally involved with cartoonist Juan López Fernández, "Jan".

Career 
Alibés i Riera was a regular contributor to media outlets (Avui, Cavall Fort, Tretzevents, Regió 7, El 9 Nou, Catalunya Ràdio, Ràdio Olot), and a children's author. She wrote forty books for children, including novels and story books. Some of these books were translated into Basque, Spanish, Aranese, Galician and French. She penned How to Make a Comic Book (1989), with Jan. She was a historian and teacher. Riera remained active, writing books even in 2009, the year she died, since two of her books, Superfantasmas in a Supermarket' (Bruño) and 'Grillo Gherkin' ('Grill cordill' in Catalan, both with Bruño) were published that year.

Awards 
Freya, 1981 :
Prize Cavall Fort de contes, 1983, for Contestadors automaàtics
Fundació d'Amics de les Arts i les Lletres de Sabadell, 1984, for On podria pondre un ou?
National Library of Munich, 1983, Tasme the ghost

Works 
Buscando un nombre, La Galera, 1979 (Searching for a name, 1979)
Tasma el fantasma, Teide, 1983 (Tasme, the ghost, 1985)
Contestadors automàtics, premio Cavall Fort de cuentos de las Fiestas Populares de Cultura Pompeu Fabra, 1983
Máquinas de empaquetar humo y otros inventos, La Galera, 1984 (Smoke Packing Machines and Other Engines)
Vamos a contar ratones, La Galera, 1986 (Let's count mice)
Un botón llorón, La Galera, 1987 (A weeping button)
El planeta Mo, Crüilla, 1988
Superfantasmas en un supermercado, Bruño, 1993 (Superfantasmas in a supermarket)
El planeta de cristal, El Arca de Junior, 1994 (The Crystal Planet)
Niebla en los bolsillos, La Galera, 1998 (Fog in the pockets)
Grillo Pepinillo, Bruño, 2003 (Grill Cordill, 1996 )

References 

1941 births
2009 deaths
Writers from Catalonia
People from Osona
Women writers from Catalonia
Spanish children's writers
Spanish women children's writers